East Down is a village and civil parish in the Barnstaple district of Devon, England. It includes the hamlets of Churchill, Shortacombe, Brockham and Clifton.  The parish contains a church, pub and manor house.

Historic estates
The estate of Northcote was listed in the Domesday Book of 1086 and was the earliest known seat of the de Northcote family which became Northcote Baronets in 1641, by which time they had moved to Hayne, in the parish of Newton St Cyres, and were created Earls of Iddesleigh in 1885, by which time they were seated at Upton Pyne.  The Heraldic Visitations of Devon  lists the founder of the family as Galfridus de Northcote, Miles ("knight"), living in 1103. The family later in the 16th century made its fortune as cloth merchants at Crediton

Notes

External links

Villages in Devon